This is a list of 82 genera in Heleomyzidae, a family of flies in the order Diptera.

Heleomyzidae genera

Aberdareleria Woznica, 1993 c g
Acantholeria Garrett, 1921 i c g
Allophylina Tonnoir & Malloch, 1927 c g
Allophylopsis Lamb, 1909 c g
Amoebaleria Garrett, 1921 b
Amphidysis McAlpine, 1985 c g
Anastomyza Malloch, 1927 c g
Aneuria Malloch, 1930 c g
Anorostoma Loew, 1862 i c g b
Apophoneura Malloch, 1933 c g
Austroleria McAlpine, 1985 c g
Balticoleria Woznica, 2007 g
Blaesochaetophora Czerny, 1904 c g
Borboroides Malloch, 1925 c g
Borboropsis Czerny, 1902 i c g b
Cairnsimyia Malloch, 1931 c g
Cephodapedon Malloch, 1933 c g
Chaetohelomyza Hennig, 1965 g
Cinderella Steyskal, 1949 i c g b
Desertoleria Gorodkov, 1962 c g
Diacia Wiedemann, 1830 c g
Dichromya Robineau-Desvoidy, 1830 c g
Dihoplopyga Malloch, 1933 g
Dioche McAlpine, 1985 c g
Diplogeomyza Hendel, 1917 c g
Eccoptomera Loew, 1862 i c g b
Electroleria Hennig, 1965 g
Epistomyia Hendel, 1917 c g
Fenwickia Malloch, 1930 c g
Gephyromyza Malloch, 1933 c g
Gymnomus Loew, 1863 g
Heleomicra McAlpine, 1985 c g
Heleomyza Fallén, 1810 i c g b
Heteromyza Fallén, 1820 i c g b
Kiboleria Lindner, 1956 c g
Leriella Meunier, 1908 g
Leriopsis McAlpine, 1967 c g
Lutomyia Aldrich, 1922 i c g
Mayomyia Malloch, 1934 c g
Morpholeria Garrett, 1921 i c g
Neoleria Malloch, 1919 i c g b
Neorhinotora Lopes, 1934 i c g
Neossos Malloch, 1927 i c g
Nephellum McAlpine, 1985 c g
Nidomyia Papp, 1998 c g
Notomyza Malloch, 1933 c g
Oecothea Haliday, 1837 i c g b
Oldenbergiella Czerny, 1924 i c g
Ollix McAlpine, 1985 c g
Orbellia Robineau-Desvoidy, 1830 i c g b
Paleoheleomyza Woznica & Palaczyk, 2005 g
Paraneossos Wheeler, 1955 i c g
Paratrixoscelis Soos, 1977 c g
Pentachaeta McAlpine, 1985 c g
Philotroctes Czerny, 1930 c g
Porsenus Aldrich & Darlington, 1908 i c g
Prosopantrum Enderlein, 1912 c g
Protoorbellia Woznica, 2006 g
Protosuillia Hennig, 1965 g
Pseudoleria Garrett, 1921 i c g
Psiloplagia Czerny, 1928 c g
Rhinotora Schiner, 1868 c g
Rhinotoroides Lopes, 1934 c g
Schroederella Enderlein, 1920 i c g b
Scoliocentra Loew, 1862 i c g b
Spilochroa Williston, 1907 i c g
Stuckenbergiella Cogan, 1971 c g
Suillia Robineau-Desvoidy, 1830 i c g b
Tapeigaster Macquart, 1847 c g
Tephrochlaena Czerny, 1924 c g
Tephrochlamys Loew, 1862 i c g b
Trixoleria McAlpine, 1967 c g
Trixoscelis Rondani, 1856 i c g b
Waterhouseia Malloch, 1936 c g
Woznicaia Koçak & Kemal, 2010 g
Xeneura Malloch, 1930 c g
Zachaetomyia Malloch, 1933 c g
Zagonia Coquillett, 1904 i c g
Zentula McAlpine, 1985 c g
Zinza Sinclair & McAlpine, 1995 c g

Data sources: i = ITIS, c = Catalogue of Life, g = GBIF, b = Bugguide.net

References

H
Heleomyzidae